Leopole Hanson (27 September 1883 – 27 April 1952) was an Australian cricketer. He played in three first-class matches for South Australia in 1905/06.

See also
 List of South Australian representative cricketers

References

External links
 

1883 births
1952 deaths
Australian cricketers
South Australia cricketers
Cricketers from Adelaide